Ellis Cove is a bay in the U.S. state of Washington.

Ellis Cove has the name of Isaac "Ike" Ellis, a local lumberman.

References

Landforms of Thurston County, Washington
Bays of Washington (state)